WAXM is a Country-formatted broadcast radio station licensed to Big Stone Gap, Virginia, serving Southwest Virginia and Eastern Kentucky. WAXM is owned and operated by Valley Broadcasting and Communications, Inc.

References

External links
 93-5 WAXM Online
 

1975 establishments in Virginia
AXM
Radio stations established in 1975
Wise County, Virginia